Droogmansia scaettaiana is a plant in the legume family Fabaceae, native to West Africa.

Description
The species is likely a pyrophyte (one adapted to recover from fire).

Distribution and habitat
Droogmansia scaettaiana is native to the region from Guinea to Ivory Coast.

Conservation
Droogmansia scaettaiana is threatened by mining activity at sites in Guinea and Liberia. Urbanization and agriculture pose a threat in other areas.

References

Desmodieae
Flora of Guinea
Flora of Ivory Coast
Flora of Liberia
Flora of Sierra Leone
Plants described in 1952
Taxa named by Auguste Chevalier